Working Woman was an American magazine that ceased publication in September 2001 after 25 years.

History and profile
Working Woman was first published in November 1976. The magazine was acquired by Lang Communications in 1978. It was published on a monthly basis. The magazine and its sister publication Working Mother were sold to MacDonald led by Jay MacDonald in 1996. The magazine were later published by Delia Passi Smalter. As its name implies, the magazine targeted working women, unlike traditional women's magazines which focused on women's roles as wives and mothers, or on fashion.

References

External links
Sophia Smith Collection, Smith College
Working Woman Magazine letters, 1976-2001,
Handmade and Personalised Mother's Day Gift Ideas

Monthly magazines published in the United States
Defunct women's magazines published in the United States
Magazines established in 1976
Magazines disestablished in 2001
Magazines published in New York City